Notarcha digitalis is a moth in the family Crambidae. It was described by Jay C. Shaffer and Eugene G. Munroe in 2007. It is found on the Seychelles, where it has been recorded from Aldabra.

References

Moths described in 2007
Spilomelinae